The 2008 season of the Palau Soccer League was the fifth season of association football competition in Palau. Kramers FC won the championship, their first title.

References

Palau Soccer League seasons
Palau
Soccer